The 1914 Dayton St. Mary's Cadets season was their second season in the Ohio League. The team posted a 5–5 record.

Schedule

Game notes

References
Pro Football Archives: Dayton St. Mary's Cadets 1914

Dayton Triangles seasons
Dayton Tri
Dayton Tri